Ann Sheetal is an Indian model and actress, who works in the Malayalam and Tamil film industry.

Career 
She made her debut as Rosy in Prithviraj's Malayalam film Ezra. She played the lead role as the heroine in a Malayalam love based film Ishq in 2019. She also acted in Tamil action crime-thriller film Kaalidas written and directed by Sri Senthil.

Filmography

Music videos

References

External links

Living people
1994 births
Indian film actresses
Actresses in Tamil cinema
Actresses in Malayalam cinema
Actresses in Telugu cinema